CIMA-FM (92.1 FM, FM 92 South Simcoe) is a radio station licensed to Alliston, Ontario. Owned by Local Radio Lab Inc., it broadcasts an adult contemporary format targeting South Simcoe County.

My Broadcasting received approval for the new station from the CRTC on September 12, 2012. On August 30, 2013, CIMA began on-air tests. The station began regular broadcasting on September 19, 2013. The station was branded as 92.1 myFM.

On June 25, 2021, the CRTC approved the sale of CIMA to Local Radio Lab.

References

External links
FM 92 South Simcoe
 

Ima
Ima
Radio stations established in 2012
2012 establishments in Ontario
IMA